Sheldon is a city in O'Brien and Sioux counties in the U.S. state of Iowa, along the Floyd River. The population was 5,512 at the time of the 2020 census; it is the largest city in O'Brien County.

History and culture

Sheldon got its start in the year 1873, following construction of the Sioux City & St. Paul Railroad through that territory. It was named for Israel Sheldon, a railroad promoter. It was a strategic location on the rail for businesses from as far away as Minneapolis and Omaha, after the addition of the intersection with the Chicago, Milwaukee and St. Paul Railway in 1878.

The growth in infrastructure has continued. Today, the city lies at the crossroads of Iowa Highway 60 and U.S. Route 18. Eastbound and westbound rail service is provided by IC&E Railroad (since 2008 a subsidiary of Canadian Pacific Railway), while northbound and southbound service is provided by Union Pacific Railroad.

The city's first financial institution, the Sheldon State Bank, closed in 1903. In 1961, the city made headlines when it was revealed that Burnice Geiger had embezzled more than two million dollars from the Sheldon National Bank, operated by her father. She was sentenced to fifteen years in prison in the same year, but paroled in 1966.

Today, the city is most known for its annual display of marigolds and the moniker of its local schools' athletic teams—the Orabs. The name stands for the school colors orange and black. Sheldon High School also hosts the Sheldon High School Summer Theatre program. Sheldon is the home of Northwest Iowa Community College and the Carnegie Library, which was placed on the National Register of Historic Places in 1977.

In popular culture
Sheldon was mentioned on page 13 of the Tim O'Brien book If I Die in a Combat Zone, Box Me Up and Ship Me Home: "Together we watched trombones and crepe-paper floats move down mainstreet. The bands and floats represented Sheldon, Tyler, Sibley, Jackson, and a dozen other neighboring towns".

Ken Snyder, pastor of the Parkview Assembly of God in Sheldon, self-released a record album entitled Ken: By Request Only in 1976. The record jacket—featuring Snyder in now-outdated hair and clothes—has made the LP popular on websites that highlight unusual-looking album covers.

Geography
Sheldon is located at  (43.181180, −95.848123).

Climate

Demographics

2010 census
At the 2010 census there were 5,188 people, 2,213 households, and 1,300 families living in the city. The racial makeup of the city was 93.7% White, 0.6% African American, 1.1% Asian, 3.7% from other races, and 0.8% from two or more races. Hispanic or Latino of any race were 6.5%.

Of the 2,213 households 26.3% had children under the age of 18 living with them, 49.6% were married couples living together, 6.3% had a female householder with no husband present, 2.9% had a male householder with no wife present, and 41.3% were non-families. 35.0% of households were one person and 17.5% were one person aged 65 or older. The average household size was 2.28 and the average family size was 2.96.

The median age was 39.4 years. 23.1% of residents were under the age of 18; 9.5% were between the ages of 18 and 24; 24.1% were from 25 to 44; 24.8% were from 45 to 64; and 18.6% were 65 or older. The gender makeup of the city was 50.7% male and 49.3% female.

2000 census
At the 2000 census there were 4,914 people, 2,006 households, and 1,285 families living in the city. The racial makeup of the city was 97.48% White, 0.43% African American, 0.06% Native American, 0.77% Asian, 0.81% from other races, and 0.45% from two or more races. Hispanic or Latino of any race were 2.56%.

Of the 2,006 households 29.0% had children under the age of 18 living with them, 56.5% were married couples living together, 4.9% had a female householder with no husband present, and 35.9% were non-families. 31.2% of households were one person and 13.0% were one person aged 65 or older. The average household size was 2.34 and the average family size was 2.96.

Age spread: 23.6% under the age of 18, 10.8% from 18 to 24, 24.9% from 25 to 44, 21.2% from 45 to 64, and 19.5% 65 or older. The median age was 38 years. For every 100 females, there were 95.9 males. For every 100 females age 18 and over, there were 94.1 males.

The median household income was $34,058 and the median family income was $43,346. Males had a median income of $31,026 versus $20,604 for females. The per capita income for the city was $18,254. About 3.6% of families and 7.6% of the population were below the poverty line, including 8.1% of those under age 18 and 6.2% of those age 65 or over.

Education
Sheldon is served by the Sheldon Community School District, which include Sheldon High School. There are two private schools, both of which offer preschool services through the eighth grade, the Sheldon Christian School and the St. Patrick's Catholic School.

Sheldon is also home to Northwest Iowa Community College, a two-year associate degree community college.

Notable people  

 William D. Boies, lawyer and politician
 Tom Brands (born 1968) gold medalist in freestyle wrestling at the 1996 Olympic Games, head wrestling coach at the University of Iowa
 Terry Brands (born 1968) bronze medalist in freestyle wrestling at the 2000 Olympic Games
 Eugene Burdick (1918–1965) writer
 A.G. Kruger (born 1979) competitor at the 2004 and 2008 Olympic Games
 Dennis Marion Schnurr (born 1948) Archbishop of the Roman Catholic Archdiocese of Cincinnati, Ohio
 Michael J. Streit (born 1950) former Iowa Supreme Court justice
 George Kelly (1905–1967) American educational and existentialist psychologist.

Media
Sheldon is home to a KIWA (AM) and KIWA-FM.

Iowa Information, Inc., publishes The Sheldon Mail-Sun and The N'West Iowa REVIEW. The N'West Iowa REVIEW has been named the state's Newspaper of the Year 17 times, and named the best weekly in the United States by the National Newspaper Association from 2000 to 2005, and again in 2007.

References

External links
 

 Sheldon, Iowa
 City Data Comprehensive Statistical Data and more about Sheldon

 
Cities in Iowa
Cities in O'Brien County, Iowa
Cities in Sioux County, Iowa